Drums Around the World (subtitled Philly Joe Jones Big Band Sounds) is the second album led by American jazz drummer Philly Joe Jones which was recorded in 1959 for the Riverside label.

Reception

The Allmusic review states: "There is some strong playing but this set is primarily recommended to fans of Philly Joe Jones's drum solos."

Track listing
All compositions by Philly Joe Jones except as indicated
 "Blue Gwynn" - 7:29    
 "Stablemates" (Benny Golson) - 5:56    
 "Stablemates" [alternate take] (Golson) - 4:27 Bonus track on CD reissue    
 "Carioca ("El Tambores")" (Edward Eliscu, Gus Kahn, Vincent Youmans) - 4:29
 "Tribal Message" - 2:51    
 "Cherokee" (Ray Noble) - 8:17    
 "Land of the Blue Veils" (Golson) - 3:38    
 "Philly J.J." (Tadd Dameron) - 10:13   
Recorded in New York City on May 4 (tracks 4, 7 & 8), May 11 (tracks 1-3 & 6) and May 28 (track 5), 1959.

Personnel 
Philly Joe Jones - drums
Blue Mitchell (tracks 1-3 & 6), Lee Morgan (tracks 1-4 & 6-8) - trumpet 
Curtis Fuller - trombone (tracks 1-4 & 6-8) 
Herbie Mann - flute, piccolo (tracks 4, 7 & 8)
Cannonball Adderley - alto saxophone (tracks 1-4 & 6-8)
Benny Golson - tenor saxophone (tracks 1-4 & 6-8)
Sahib Shihab - baritone saxophone (tracks 1-4 & 6-8)
Wynton Kelly - piano (tracks 1-4 & 6-8)
Jimmy Garrison (tracks 4, 7 & 8), Sam Jones (tracks 1-3 & 6) - bass

References 

1959 albums
Philly Joe Jones albums
Albums produced by Orrin Keepnews
Riverside Records albums